Héverton Cardoso da Silva (born January 14, 1988 in São Paulo, Brazil), known as just Héverton, is a Brazilian footballer, who currently plays as a centre-back.

Career
Grêmio signed the defender on loan from  Pão de Açúcar in 2007. Later, the deal become permanent and Héverton signed a contract until December 2009.

After a lot of injuries and suspensions in the first team defenders, Héverton was selected from the youth team to play the last matches of the Campeonato Brasileiro 2008.

On November 9, he made his first team debut in a 0-1 away victory against Palmeiras. In the following game, on November 16, he scored his first professional goal, the second in a 2-1 home win against Coritiba. On July 7, 2009, Héverton was loaned to Serie B side América de Natal.

He signed for Brasil de Pelotas in Campeonato Brasileiro Série B in 2018.

Honours 
Cuiabá
 Campeonato Mato-Grossense: 2017

References

External links

1988 births
Living people
Footballers from São Paulo
Association football defenders
Brazilian footballers
Campeonato Brasileiro Série A players
Campeonato Brasileiro Série B players
Campeonato Brasileiro Série C players
Grêmio Osasco Audax Esporte Clube players
Grêmio Foot-Ball Porto Alegrense players
América Futebol Clube (RN) players
Guarani FC players
Fortaleza Esporte Clube players
Futebol Clube Santa Cruz players
Esporte Clube Pelotas players
Macaé Esporte Futebol Clube players
Esporte Clube Juventude players
Sampaio Corrêa Futebol Clube players
Cuiabá Esporte Clube players
Grêmio Esportivo Brasil players